The Evergrande Group is a Chinese property developer.

Evergrande may also refer to:

Sport
 Guangzhou F.C., formerly known as Guangzhou Evergrande Football Club
 Guangzhou Evergrande Football Stadium, a stadium under construction in Guangzhou
 Evergrande Football School in Qingyuan
 Guangdong Evergrande Volleyball Club (Women) in Shenzhen

Buildings
 Evergrande Center, a skyscraper under construction in Shenzhen
 Evergrande International Financial Center T1, a skyscraper in Hefei whose construction is on hold

Other
 Evergrande New Energy Auto, an automobile manufacturer owned by Evergrande Group